Eric Brunner may refer to:
 Eric Brunner (soccer)
 Eric Brunner (epidemiologist)
 Eric Brunner (cyclist)